New Russell  is a community in the Canadian province of Nova Scotia, located in the Chester Municipal District. The South Canoe Wind Energy Project is proposed for this area.

References
New Russell on Destination Nova Scotia

Communities in Lunenburg County, Nova Scotia